The Son of Hannibal is a 1926 German silent film directed by Felix Basch and starring Liane Haid, Alfons Fryland, and Ferdinand von Alten.

The film's art direction was by Robert Neppach.

Cast
Liane Haid
Alfons Fryland
Ferdinand von Alten
Albert Paulig
Sig Arno
Alexander Murski

Nikolai Malikoff
Manasse Herbst

References

External links

Films of the Weimar Republic
German silent feature films
Films directed by Felix Basch
Films based on German novels
German horse racing films
German black-and-white films
Remakes of German films
UFA GmbH films
1920s German films
1920s German-language films